Karakaya is the highest peak in the Skalisty Range, North Caucasus.

It is located in the Kabardino-Balkaria federal subject of Russia, between the Chegem and Cherek rivers.

See also
List of mountains and hills of Russia

References

Mountains of Russia
Mountains of the Caucasus
North Caucasus